The Words is a 2012 American mystery romantic drama film, written and directed by Brian Klugman and Lee Sternthal in their directorial debut. It stars Bradley Cooper, Zoe Saldana, Olivia Wilde, Jeremy Irons, Ben Barnes, Dennis Quaid, and Nora Arnezeder. Cooper, a childhood friend of Klugman and Sternthal from Philadelphia, was also the executive producer.

Plot 
Clayton Hammond is doing a reading of his new book, The Words. He begins reading from the book, which is centered on the fictional character Rory Jansen, an aspiring writer who lives in NYC with his girlfriend, Dora. Rory borrows some money from his father, gets a job as a mail supervisor at a literary agency, and attempts to sell his first novel, which is repeatedly rejected by publishers.

After living together for some time, Rory and Dora marry and, during their honeymoon in Paris, Dora buys Rory an old briefcase he was admiring in an antiques store. Returning to America and having his book rejected again, Rory finds an old but masterfully written manuscript in the briefcase with a central character named Jack.

Rory types the manuscript into his laptop to know what it feels like to write something truly great, even if it's only pretend. Later, while using the laptop, Dora happens upon the novel, reading it. She mistakenly assumes that Rory wrote it and convinces him to give it to a publisher at work, Joseph Cutler. After a few months Cutler finally reads it and offers Rory a contract which he accepts. The book is a hit and Rory becomes famous.

At this point, Hammond takes a break from the reading and goes backstage, where he is introduced by his agent to Daniella, a student and amateur writer who wants to interview him. She notes that he is separated from his wife, although he still wears a wedding ring. Hammond agrees to meet her after the ceremony and returns to the stage, where he continues the reading.

The second part details Rory's encounter with an old man in Central Park, who reveals himself as the true author of the manuscript, based on his life in Paris.

When he was a young man and stationed in France with the U.S. Army in the final days of World War II, he fell in love with Celia, a French waitress. They eventually married and had a daughter, who later died.

Unable to cope with the loss, Celia left him and moved to her parents' home in the country. He then used his pain as inspiration to write the manuscript, which he took to Celia while visiting her. She found the story so moving she returned to him. However, she unintentionally left the manuscript in a briefcase on the train after her trip back to Paris, losing it. Because of this, their reconciliation was short-lived, and they divorced soon afterwards.

The public reading ends and Hammond tells his fans they must buy the book to learn how it ends. Daniella then accompanies Hammond back to his apartment where she pressures him into telling her the ending. Hammond explains that Rory tells the truth about the creation of the story, first to his wife and then to Cutler. He also tells him he wants to credit the old man as the true author. Cutler angrily advises against this as it would severely damage both their reputations, and recommends giving the old man a share of the book's profits instead.

Rory then seeks out the old man to pay him and finds him working in a plant nursery. He refuses the money, then tells about seeing Celia once more. While riding the train to work, years after his divorce, he spotted her with a new husband and a young son at a train station. The old man points out that people always move on from their mistakes, and Rory will too.

Daniella continues to pressure Hammond for more details. He reveals that the old man died not long after Rory's second meeting with him along with the secret of the manuscript's true author. Daniella deduces that The Words is actually an autobiographical book, with Rory as Hammond's surrogate.

She kisses him, reassuring him that people move on from their mistakes, but he pulls away, telling her that there is a fine line between life and fiction. The film flashes back to Rory and Dora in their tiny kitchen, as Rory whispers "I'm sorry" in her ear.

Cast 
 Bradley Cooper as Rory Jansen
 Zoe Saldana as Dora Jansen
 Olivia Wilde as Daniella
 Jeremy Irons as The Old Man
 Ben Barnes as the Young Man
 Dennis Quaid as Clay Hammond
 J. K. Simmons as Mr. Jansen
 John Hannah as Richard Ford
 Nora Arnezeder as Celia
 Željko Ivanek as Joseph Cutler
 Michael McKean as Nelson Wyllie
 Ron Rifkin as Timothy Epstein
 Brian Klugman as Jason Rosen
 Liz Stauber as Camy Rosen
 Lee Sternthal as Brett Copsey

Themes
The script includes several references to writer Ernest Hemingway. Rory and Dora view a commemorative plaque to Hemingway during their Paris honeymoon. The plot device of Celia leaving her husband's manuscript in a leather satchel on a train is reminiscent of a similar episode in Hemingway's life, when his first wife Hadley left a briefcase containing all of his writings up to 1922 on a train; the manuscripts were never recovered. Roger Ebert points out the similarity between the name of the character "The Old Man" and Hemingway's novel The Old Man and the Sea, and the commonality of the name Dora among the wives of novelists.

Allegations of similarity to German novel

According to some Swiss newspapers, the plot of The Words is similar to that of the 2004 novel Lila Lila by Martin Suter (made into the German film Lila, Lila released in 2009), which is also about a young unsuccessful author who discovers an old manuscript, is pushed by his girlfriend into publishing it, becomes enormously successful, is later confronted by an old man who is (or in that case, knows) the original author, and then publishes a second book about how this all happened.

Brian Klugman and Lee Sternthal say that they knew nothing of Suter, his work, or Lila Lila. They had the idea and began writing The Words in 1999, years before Lila Lila was published. Together they attended the 2000 Sundance Screenwriter's Lab with their original screenplay.

Production

Filming 
Filming began in Montreal, Quebec, Canada, on June 7, 2011 for a period of 25 days. The Montreal location was used because it could pass as both Paris and New York.

Release 
The Words had its world premiere at the 2012 Sundance Film Festival. Prior to its official premiere and following a press and industry screening at Sundance, the film was purchased by CBS Films for $2 million with a $1.5 million print and advertising commitment.

The Words grossed nearly $11.5 million in North America and $1.7 million worldwide, against a production budget of $6 million.

Reception 
The Words received mostly negative reviews from critics. On Rotten Tomatoes it has a 22% rating based on 117 reviews with an average rating of 4.6/10 and the consensus stating: "Neither as clever nor as interesting as it appears to think it is, The Words maroons its talented stars in an overly complex, dramatically inert literary thriller that's ultimately a poor substitute for a good book". At Metacritic, the film received 37 out of 100 with "generally unfavorable reviews" from 30 critics. Audiences polled by CinemaScore gave the film an average grade of "B" on an A+ to F scale.

Jen Chaney from The Washington Post gave the film 1.5 out of 5 stars, saying it "is a well-acted but narratively limp indie that’s undermined by a failure to connect emotionally with its audience". Chris Pandolfi from At A Theater Near You praised the film, saying that while its "ambiguity is unlikely to be appreciated by everyone," it "deserves to be structurally, emotionally, and thematically analyzed". Stephen Holden of The New York Times also praised the film as "a clever, entertaining yarn".

References

External links 
 
 
 

2012 films
2012 romantic drama films
American romantic drama films
CBS Films films
2010s English-language films
Films scored by Marcelo Zarvos
Films about writers
Films directed by Brian Klugman
Films set in New York City
Films shot in Montreal
Films about interracial romance
Films involved in plagiarism controversies
American psychological thriller films
2012 psychological thriller films
American romantic thriller films
2012 directorial debut films
2010s American films